Paulino Monsalve Ballesteros (born 30 October 1958) is a former field hockey player from Spain, who won the silver medal with the Men's National Team at the 1980 Summer Olympics in Moscow.

References

External links
 

1958 births
Living people
Spanish male field hockey players
Olympic field hockey players of Spain
Field hockey players at the 1980 Summer Olympics
Olympic silver medalists for Spain
Olympic medalists in field hockey
Medalists at the 1980 Summer Olympics
20th-century Spanish people